Nuclear factor of activated T-cells, cytoplasmic 2 is a protein that in humans is encoded by the NFATC2 gene.

Function 

This gene is a member of the nuclear factor of activated T cells (NFAT) family. The product of this gene is a DNA-binding protein with a REL-homology region (RHR) and an NFAT-homology region (NHR). This protein is present in the cytosol and only translocates to the nucleus upon T cell receptor (TCR) stimulation, where it becomes a member of the nuclear factors of activated T cells transcription complex. This complex plays a central role in inducing gene transcription during the immune response. Alternate transcriptional splice variants, encoding different isoforms, have been characterized.

Clinical significance 

Translocation forming an in frame fusions product between EWSR1 gene and the NFATc2 gene has been described in bone tumor with a Ewing sarcoma-like clinical appearance. The translocation breakpoint led to the loss of the controlling elements of the NFATc2 protein and the fusion of the N terminal region of the EWSR1 gene conferred constant activation of the protein.

Interactions 

NFATC2 has been shown to interact with MEF2D, EP300, IRF4 and Protein kinase Mζ. Prostaglandin F2alpha stimulates a NFCT2 pathway stimulating growth of skeletal muscle cells.

References

Further reading

External links 
 

Transcription factors
Human proteins